John George Children FRS FRSE FLS PRES (18 May 1777 – 1 January 1852 in Halstead, Kent) was a British chemist, mineralogist and zoologist. He invented a method to extract silver from ore without the need for mercury. He was a friend of Sir Humphry Davy, who helped him secure a controversial appointment to a post in the British Museum. Children was also the founding president of the Royal Entomological Society.

Personal life
John George was born on 18 May 1777 at Ferox Hall, Tonbridge, Kent. His father George Children, FRS (1742–1818), a banker, belonged to a family that lived at the home, "Childrens", near Nether Street in Hildenborough and his mother Susanna, who was the daughter of Rev. Thomas Marshall Jordan of West Farleigh died six days after he was born.

Children studied at Tonbridge School, Eton College and Queens' College, Cambridge. In 1798 he married Hester Anna Holwell, granddaughter of John Zephaniah Holwell in 1798. After her death in 1800, he began to travel widely. He married Caroline, daughter of George Furlong Wise of Woolston, in 1809, but she died the next year. In 1819 he married a Mrs. Towers (who died in 1839).

In 1815 he travelled to the battlefield of Waterloo where he purchased the Waterloo Elm, the tree under which the Duke of Wellington had made his headquarters but which had been stripped bare by souvenir hunters. He had it made into several notable pieces of furniture by Thomas Chippendale, including chairs now in the Royal Collection, at Apsley House and Belvoir Castle.

He died at Halstead Place in Kent.

Scientific career
He was a friend of Sir Humphry Davy and together they conducted several experiments. In 1808 he visited Spain where he met Joseph Blanco White. In 1813 he constructed a large galvanic cell and conducted experiments using them. These were published in Philosophical Transactions in 1815 and for this he received the Royal Institution medal in 1828. In 1824 he discovered a method of extracting silver without the need for mercury which was purchased by several American mining companies.

In 1822 he was working as a librarian in the Department of Antiquities at the British Museum when he was appointed assistant keeper of the Natural History Department in succession to William Elford Leach. The appointment, influenced by Sir Humphry Davy, was controversial as he was less qualified than another applicant, William John Swainson. Children found himself poorly qualified in zoology and depended greatly on John Edward Gray who worked as a day-worker. Gray's own application to the post that Children held had been passed over due to rivalries with influential members of the Linnean Society. Some visitors to the British Museum like Edward Blyth found him uncooperative. After the division of the Department into three sections in 1837 he became keeper of the Department of Zoology, retiring in 1840 and succeeded by his assistant John Edward Gray. After his retirement he took an interest in astronomy.

Children was made a fellow of the Royal Society in 1807, and served as the society's secretary in 1826, and from 1830 to 1837. In 1833, he was founding president of what became the Royal Entomological Society of London. His name is commemorated in the names of several species, most described by Gray or his brother, including the Australian Children's python, Antaresia childreni, the Australian stick insect Tropidoderus childrenii, the North American lady beetle Exochomus childreni as well as a mineral called childrenite. John James Audubon named a warbler after him, but the specimen turned out to be a juvenile yellow warbler.

Family
His only daughter (from his first wife Hester Anna) was Anna Atkins, a botanist, who is best known for her book of cyanotype photograms of algae, the first book of exclusively photographic images ever made. She wrote a memoir on the life of her father which included several unpublished poems.

References

British chemists
British mineralogists
British zoologists
1777 births
1852 deaths
People educated at Tonbridge School
People educated at Eton College
Alumni of Queens' College, Cambridge
Fellows of the Royal Society
Fellows of the Royal Society of Edinburgh
Fellows of the Linnean Society of London
Presidents of the Royal Entomological Society
Employees of the Natural History Museum, London
19th-century chemists
19th-century British scientists
19th-century British zoologists
People from Tonbridge